Tam Kwok-kiu, MH, JP (born 13 September 1957) is a Hong Kong Association for Democracy and People's Livelihood (ADPL) politician in Hong Kong. He is the current member of the Sham Shui Po District Council, serving from 1985 to 2011 and again since 2016. He had also been chairman and vice-chairman of the council.

Biography
Tam was born in Hong Kong in 1957. He was educated at the La Salle College and graduated from the Hong Kong Baptist College in 1978 with a degree in Social Work. He joined Frederick Fung to work as a social worker in Sham Shui Po. In 1983, he helped Fung to get elected to the Urban Council. In the 1985 District Board elections, he was elected to the Sham Shui Po District Board. In 1986, he co-founded the Hong Kong Association for Democracy and People's Livelihood (ADPL) with Fung and other pro-democracy grassroots activists.

In the 1995 Urban Council election, Tam won a seat in Sham Shui Po East uncontestedly. He held the seat through 1997 until the provisional council was abolished in 2000. In 1997, he was elected chairman of the Provisional Sham Shui Po District Council. His chairmanship ended in 2007 when the ADPL lost majority in the council. He was elected vice-chairman of the council instead.

In 2005, Tam represented pan-democrats to run in the Hong Kong and Kowloon District Councils Subsector by-election for the Election Committee but was not elected.

In 2011 District Council elections, he was unexpectedly defeated by pro-Beijing independent Wai Hoi-ying in Nam Shan, Tai Hang Tung & Tai Hang Sai constituency when he tried to retain ADPL's seat from retiring party colleague Wong Kwai-wan.

In the next year's Legislative Council election, Tam represented ADPL to run in Kowloon West, succeeding Frederick Fung who run in the newly established District Council (Second) "super seat". Tam received 30,364 votes and could not win a seat for the ADPL.

In 2015 District Council elections, Tam won back a seat in Nam Shan, Tai Hang Tung & Tai Hang Sai, defeating Wai Hoi-ying with a margin of 572 votes. He successfully defended his seat in the 2019 elections, winning 4,546 votes.

In 2016, Tam narrowly defeated chairwoman Rosanda Mok in a primary to stand again in Kowloon West for the 2016 Legislative Council election.

He also holds a master's degree in social science from the Chinese University of Hong Kong and a master's degree in social work from the University of Hong Kong.

References

1957 births
Living people
Alumni of the Chinese University of Hong Kong
Alumni of Hong Kong Baptist University
Alumni of the University of Hong Kong
District councillors of Sham Shui Po District
Hong Kong social workers
Hong Kong Association for Democracy and People's Livelihood politicians